Richard Frys was a weaver and the member of the Parliament of England for Marlborough for the parliaments of April 1384 and 1394.

References 

Members of Parliament for Marlborough
English MPs April 1384
Year of birth unknown
Year of death unknown
British weavers
English MPs 1394